The  is an electric multiple unit (EMU) train type on order by Osaka Metro. Scheduled for an April 2023 service introduction, a total of 23 six-car sets are to be built.

Operations 
A total of 23 six-car sets are due to be introduced from April 2023 ahead of the 2025 World Expo, and to replace the 20 and 24 series trainsets currently in use on the Chuo Line.

Design 
The design of the 400 series was overseen by Ken Okuyama.

Exterior 
The exterior design of the 400 series is intended to resemble that of a spaceship, featuring an octagonal front end and headlight clusters at each of the four corners. The 400 series was developed in consideration of the 2025 World Expo, high levels of comfort and safety, accessibility, and to be "fun to ride". In addition, the train type will have lower floor heights than their predecessors, as well as more clearly marked priority seating. The sets use aluminium for body construction.

Interior 
The interior incorporates calm color palette, and the longitudinal seats use a varied color palette.

Passenger accommodation consists of longitudinal seating throughout, except for one car, which features transverse seating. Priority seating is provided. Passenger information displays will be provided, displaying information in Japanese, English, Chinese, and Korean.

The luggage racks are  lower than those of other train types.

Formation 
The sets are formed as follows.

History 
The trains were first announced by Osaka Metro on 9 December 2021. Production of the 400 series fleet commenced in 2022, and the first set was delivered from Hitachi's Kasado plant in October of that year. On 7 December 2022, Osaka Metro unveiled the first 400 series to the press.

References

External links 
 Official press release 

Electric multiple units of Japan
400 series
Train-related introductions in 2023
Hitachi multiple units
750 V DC multiple units